Mesgrigny is a commune in the Aube department in north-central France. It is a small village located in the canton of Creney-près-Troyes and the arrondissement of Nogent-sur-Seine. The nearest towns are Romilly-sur-Seine (12 km to the west) and Troyes (25 km to the southeast).

Population

See also
Communes of the Aube department

References

Communes of Aube
Aube communes articles needing translation from French Wikipedia